Jeanne Colette Dubin ( Evert; October 5, 1957 – February 20, 2020) was an American professional tennis player and the younger sister of Chris Evert. She was ranked as high as 28th by the WTA in 1978 and ninth within the United States in 1974. She reached the third round of the U.S. Open in 1973 and 1978. She won all four of her Fed Cup matches for the U.S. in 1974.

Evert made her professional debut at age 15 in 1973 at what is now known as the Cincinnati Masters. She reached the singles semifinals before falling to Evonne Goolagong, and is still the youngest player to reach the semifinals in Cincinnati in the Open Era. She also paired with her sister Chris to reach the semifinals in doubles, before losing to Goolagong and Janet Young. 

Evert retired in 1978, and in later years, was a coach at the Delray Beach Tennis Center. Evert died on February 20, 2020, from ovarian cancer. She was 62.

Grand Slam tournament performance timeline

 The French Open had a main draw of 64 during these years, and the U.S. Open had a main draw of 64 until 1976.

References

External links
 
 

American female tennis players
1957 births
2020 deaths
Sportspeople from Fort Lauderdale, Florida
Tennis people from Florida
Deaths from cancer in Florida
Deaths from ovarian cancer
21st-century American women
Chris Evert